James Hough (born 1945), is a Scottish physicist. Other people with this name include:

 James Jackson Hough (1945–2019), American businessman and philanthropist 
 Jim Hough (born 1956), American professional football player
 Séamus Ó hEocha (1880–1959), Irish educator born as James Hough